Sir William Leonard Dale, KCMG (17 June 1906 – 8 February 2000) was a British lawyer and civil servant. He was legal adviser to the Commonwealth Relations Office (later renamed to the Commonwealth Office) from 1961 to 1966.

The Sir William Dale Centre for Legislative Studies at the Institute of Advanced Legal Studies is named in his honour.

References 

1906 births
2000 deaths
Knights Commander of the Order of St Michael and St George
English solicitors
Members of Gray's Inn
Civil servants in the Commonwealth Relations Office